Hong Kah Group Representation Constituency was a five-member Group Representation Constituency located in the western area of Singapore. The constituency covered the areas of Bukit Batok, Choa Chu Kang, Upper Bukit Timah, Jurong West and Lim Chu Kang. Hong Kah GRC was formed in 1988 and eventually dissolved and reformed into Chua Chu Kang GRC in 2011. It had always been held by the People's Action Party.

It was divided into five sub-areas namely, Bukit Gombak, Hong Kah, Keat Hong, Nanyang and Yew Tee. In 2001, Bukit Gombak SMC was absorbed into the GRC with the town council being Hong Kah Town Council.

It was a huge constituency in terms of land area and covered the entire north-western region of Singapore and its territorial waters in the Straits of Johor.

History
In 1988, Hong Kah GRC was formed. Hong Kah North compromising of Bukit Gombak and Tengah (previous Hong Kah Village), Hong Kah Central consisting of parts of Hong Kah Village and Jurong East (Neighbourhood 3) and Hong Kah South consisting of Jurong West (Neighbourhood 4 & 5).

In 1991, Hong Kah GRC was reorganized. Hong Kah South consisting of the Jurong West Neighbourhood 4 and 5, Hong Kah East consisting of the Jurong East Neighbourhood 3 and Hong Kah Village, Hong Kah North compromising of Bukit Gombak and Tengah, while Hong Kah West consists of Jurong West Neighbourhood 7 and 8.

In 1997, Hong Kah GRC was later reorganised. Nanyang (Jurong West Neighbourhood 9) was given from Hong Kah West and Jurong SMC and Yew Tee (Choa Chu Kang N5-N7, Lim Chu Kang) was carved from Chua Chu Kang SMC.

In 2001, Hong Kah East division was renamed to Jurong Central under Jurong GRC. In return, Hong Kah West division was merged with Hong Kah North, and Keat Hong was carved from Hong Kah North, Yew Tee and Chua Chu Kang.

In 2006, Yeo Cheow Tong was supposed to retire from politics. He was saved until 2011, and Amy Khor took over the anchor minister from 2006 to 2011.

In the 2011 Singapore general election, Hong Kah GRC was dissolved. It was split into Hong Kah North of the constituency was carved out as a new Single-Member-Constituency while Bukit Gombak, Keat Hong, Nanyang and Yew Tee wards merged with then-Chua Chu Kang SMC to form the new Chua Chu Kang Group Representation Constituency and Gan Kim Yong took over the ministerial position.

Members of Parliament

Candidates and results

Elections in 2000s

Elections in 1990s

Elections in 1980s

See also
Chua Chu Kang GRC
Hong Kah North SMC
Hong Kah SMC
Yeo Cheow Tong

External links
1988 GE's result
1991 GE's result
1997 GE's result
2001 GE's result
2006 GE's result

Singaporean electoral divisions
Bukit Batok
Choa Chu Kang
Jurong West
Lim Chu Kang
Sungei Kadut
Tengah
Western Water Catchment